Note: This is a list of men's international field hockey players from Pakistan

The Pakistan national field hockey team represents Pakistan in international field hockey. It is administered and fielded by the Pakistan Hockey Federation (PHF), the governing body of the sport in the country. It competes as a member of the Asian Hockey Federation (AHF) and the Federation of International Hockey (FIH). Pakistan competed in their first international match on 2 August 1948, in a 2–1 victory over Belgium at the 1948 London Olympics.

List of players 
Pakistan has competed in numerous competitions since 1948 and all players that have made an appearance for the team are listed below with their playing details, number of caps, goals, playing position, career span and any honors won as a part of the national team squad. Statistics of total appearances and goals are referenced correctly up to matches played on 12 October 2002 by the official record of PHF found here . The records after that time period may have inadvertent errors.

1948–1959

1960–1969

1970–1979

1980–1989

1990–1999

2000–2009

2010–2019

2020–present 

Pakistan
Pakistani hockey-related lists